HM Prison Bullwood Hall is a former Category C women's prison and Young Offenders Institution, located in Hockley, Essex, England. The prison was operated by Her Majesty's Prison Service.

History
Bullwood Hall was built in the 1960s originally as a female borstal. Over time the prison also began to hold female adult prisoners.

In 2002 Bullwood Hall was featured in a series of six 30 minute documentaries titled "The Real Bad Girls".  Although the series portrayed the prison in a positive light, a 2005 report condemned Bullwood Hall for still using the practice of slopping out. A year later the prison was singled out for its high levels of attempted suicides and self-harm amongst inmates.

Bullwood Hall continued to serve as a women's prison until 2006, when it was announced that it was to be converted into a Category C male prison, due to a shortage of male prison places.

On 10 January 2013 it was announced by the government that Bullwood Hall is one of 7 British prisons to be closed. The prison closed on Thursday 28 March 2013. In November 2015 outline planning proposals were submitted to redevelop the site for residential use, including 60 homes.

Notable former inmates
 Tracie Andrews
 Sharon Carr – Britain's youngest female murderer
 Sally Clark
 Mary Druhan
 Lisa and Michelle Taylor

References

External links
Ministry of Justice on HMP Bullwood Hall
HMP Bullwood Hall - HM Inspectorate of Prisons Reports

Prisons in Essex
Women's prisons in England
1960s establishments in England
2013 disestablishments in England
Defunct prisons in England